In the English civil parish of Lymm, there are 55 buildings that are recorded in the National Heritage List for England as designated listed buildings. Of these, one is classified as Grade I and one as Grade II*; the remainder are at Grade II. Lymm is in the borough of Warrington and the ceremonial county of Cheshire. In the early 16th century, the civil parish was a prosperous agricultural area, divided into two manors, Lymm and Oughtrington. The Grade-II*-listed Lymm Hall, the oldest listed building in the civil parish, dates from the late 16th century and occupies the site of a medieval building which was the manorial seat. The largest settlement in the civil parish is Lymm, which has expanded into a small town whilst retaining its village centre. Several other small settlements within the parish remain separate, including Oughtrington; Oughtrington Hall dates from around 1810.

From the 16th century, industries developed in the parish, including quarrying, tanning, iron working, powder making and fustian cutting. Workers' cottages from the fustian-cutting industry have survived. The extension of the Bridgewater Canal, completed in 1776, facilitated industrial development. The canal runs through the northern part of the town of Lymm's centre, and many of the listed structures are associated with it, including three aqueducts, two bridges and a dock. Rapid industrial expansion occurred in the early 19th century, generating a need for an increased water supply. The damming of Bradley Brook in 1821–24 created a lake to the south of the town. Two bridges associated with Lymm Dam are listed. One carries the former toll road from Warrington to Stockport, now the A56. The other was constructed for William Lever (later Viscount Leverhulme) in 1918–19 to serve housing for his workers, which was never built. The arrival of the railway in 1853 further accelerated growth in Lymm, with substantial mid-Victorian houses being built for business owners on the edges of the town in Gothic and Italianate styles.

Many of the listed buildings lie within the three conservation areas of the town of Lymm, which encompass the old village centre, the dam and the lake, as well as the Victorian suburbs to the north and west of the centre. Lymm stands on the Mid Cheshire Ridge, with sandstone bedrock, and many of the listed buildings are constructed from this material.  Crags and outcrops are present on the surface, for example, under Lymm Cross, which is listed at Grade I. There are also a few listed timber-framed buildings, which are relatively rare in the borough of Warrington. Unusual listed structures include an octagonal water tower with battlements, icehouse, pigeon house, mounting block, milepost, stone-lined well, war memorial, water-point case and the village stocks.

Key

See also

 Listed buildings in Appleton
 Listed buildings in Dunham Massey
 Listed buildings in Grappenhall and Thelwall
 Listed buildings in High Legh
 Listed buildings in Warburton
 Listed buildings in Woolston

References
Citations

Sources

Listed buildings in Warrington
Lists of listed buildings in Cheshire